Sharafshadeh (also Romanized as Sharafshādeh and Sharaf Shādeh) is a village in Rudboneh Rural District, Rudboneh District, Lahijan County, Gilan Province, Iran. At the 2006 census, its population was 419, in 150 families.

References 

Populated places in Lahijan County